Teri Behisi is a 2021 Pakistani  television serial produced by Erfan Ghanchi under his production banner "Blue Eye Entertainment". The drama serial is written by Haniya Javed. It features Sana Fakhar, Nazish Jahangir, Hina Dilpazeer, Aijazz Aslam, Aiza Awan and Bilal Qureshi in leading roles.

 

The original soundtrack of the serial is composed and sing by Sahir Ali Bagga.

Cast
Sana Fakhar as Nighat
Nazish Jahangir as Zara
Hina Dilpazeer
Bilal Qureshi as Zayir
Aijaz Aslam as Nadeem
Naveed Raza as Kashan
Aiza Awan as Soham
Khalid Anum as Zubair
Namrah Shahid
Agha Talal
Manzoor Qureshi as Peer Sahab
Tariq Jameel as Aqeel

References

External links

Geo TV original programming
2021 Pakistani television series debuts
2021 Pakistani television series endings